The 2011 Ulster Senior Hurling Championship was the 66th  installment of the annual Ulster Senior Hurling Championship held under the auspices of the Ulster GAA. Antrim were the defending champions and successfully claimed their tenth consecutive title, beating  surprise finalists Armagh.

Format

The draw for the Ulster championship was seeded, and took place in a single elimination format. Antrim received a bye to the final, Monaghan to the semi-final. All six other teams entered in the first round.

There was no entry from the Ulster Championship to the 2011 All-Ireland Senior Hurling Championship proper. Antrim instead entered that competition through the preliminary round of the Leinster Senior Hurling Championship.

The other Ulster teams were not eligible, and took part in lower tier competitions, such as the 2011 Christy Ring Cup, the second tier All-Ireland hurling championship.

The number of teams in the championship for 2011, eight, was significantly in advance of historical numbers, but a slight drop from the ten  of 2010 as London and Cavan left the competition; London had been angered by their treatment by the Ulster GAA in relation to a fixture clash, and Cavan had proved uncompetitive, even in the earliest rounds, culminating in a heavy defeat to Tyrone in 2010.

In order to avoid mismatches, the draw was set in set so that the weaker counties were not faced with the prospect of facing regional powers Antrim at an early stage; instead all the other counties took part in a series of elimination matches for the right to meet Antrim in the final.

Teams

Bracket

References

External links
Ulster GAA website

Ulster Hurling Senior
Hurling
Ulster Senior Hurling Championship